The Torre dei Gualandi (also known as the Muda Tower,) is a former tower in Pisa, central Italy, now included in the  Palazzo dell'Orologio.

It is located on the north part of the Piazza dei Cavalieri. The original tower was located on the right side of the present building. Gualandi was the name of a Pisan family that owned the tower in the 13th century.

Ugolino della Gherardesca, his sons and two grandsons were immured in the tower and starved to death in the 13th century. Dante, his contemporary, wrote about Gherardesca in his masterpiece The Divine Comedy.

See also 
 Ugolino della Gherardesca

External links 
 https://web.archive.org/web/20060720081434/http://www.sns.it/en/scuola/luoghi/palazzodellorologio/
 http://www.comune.pisa.it/turismo/itinerari/1itinerario-gb.htm
 https://web.archive.org/web/20061110050809/http://www.endex.com/gf/buildings/ltpisa/ltparticles/ltp%20rapid%201948/ltp%20rapid%201948.htm
 http://www.pisaonline.it/ulisse/eng/manoscritti.htm

Towers in Pisa
Former buildings and structures in Italy
Former towers

pt:Palazzo dell'Orologio#História e Arquitectura